The Sulu Archipelago rain forests ecoregion (WWF ID: IM0156) covers the Sulu Archipelago, excepting Basilan Island at the northern end, in the southwest of the Philippines.  The islands are separated enough from Borneo to the south and Mindanao to the north that they have developed their own distinctive floral and faunal communities.  Most of the original rainforest has been removed or disturbed for agriculture, and political instability in the islands has hampered conservation efforts.

Location and description 

The islands are not the remains of a land bridge between Borneo and Mindanao, but rather are the product of submarine volcanoes. There are deep channels between the Sulus and the larger islands to the south and north, but the distances are not great. The current islands are low-lying and of coral limestone. The islands divide the Sulu Sea to the north from the Celebes Sea to the south. Included in the ecoregion are the islands of Sibutu, Sanga-Sanga, Tawi-Tawi, and Panguan.

Climate 
The climate of the ecoregion is Tropical rainforest climate (Köppen climate classification (Af)).  This climate is characterized as hot, humid, and having at least 60 mm of precipitation every month.

Flora and fauna 
The forest types on the islands include beach forest, mangroves, and lowland tropical rainforest.  The beach forests feature Barringtonia, Caesalpinia, and Terminalia.  Characteristic species of the lowland rain forest include Anisoptera, Dipterocarpus, Hopea, and Shorea.   Mangrove species include Rhizophora, Ceriops, Sonneratia,  Avicennia, and Mangrove palm (Nypa fruticans).  About 75% of the islands are covered with closed forest, mostly evergreen broadleaf, but this forest has been degraded by clearing in recent years.

Birds of conservation interest include the critically endangered Red-vented cockatoo (Cacatua haematuropygia) and the vulnerable Wincell's kingfisher (Todirhamphus winchelli).

Protected areas 
There are no significant protected areas in the Sulu Archipelago, although there is a small eco-tourism site covering 250 hectares on Mount Bongao.

References 

Indomalayan ecoregions
Ecoregions of the Philippines
Tropical and subtropical moist broadleaf forests